HMS Sprightly was a  torpedo boat destroyer of the British Royal Navy. She was built speculatively by Laird, Son & Company, Birkenhead, pre-empting further orders for vessels of this type, and was purchased by the navy in 1901.

Construction
Sprightly arrived at Plymouth from Birkenhead in late November 1901 for tests and fitting of navy equipment. She was placed in the B division of the Fleet Reserve at Devonport in late March 1902.

In 1912 the Admiralty directed all destroyers were to be grouped into classes designated by letters based on appearance. to provide some system to the naming of HM destroyers. "30 knotter" vessels with 4 funnels, were classified by the Admiralty as the B-class, the 3-funnelled, "30 knotters" became the C-class and the 2-funnelled ships the D-class). As a 4 funnel vessel Sprightly became a B-class.

Operational history
Sprightly was commissioned at Devonport by Commander Roger Keyes on 13 May 1902, with the crew of the destroyer , taking that ship's place in the instructional flotilla. She took part in the fleet review held at Spithead on 16 August 1902 for the coronation of King Edward VII.

References

Bibliography
 
 
 
 
 
 
 
 
 

 

Lively-class destroyers
Ships built on the River Mersey
1900 ships
B-class destroyers (1913)
World War I destroyers of the United Kingdom